Alysicarpus naikianus is a herb in the legume family Fabaceae, native to India.

Distribution and habitat
Alysicarpus naikianus is native to Gujarat, Maharashtra, Goa, Karnataka and Kerala. Its habitat is in shrubland, grassland and along roadsides, from sea level to  altitude.

References

naikianus
Flora of India (region)
Plants described in 1999